Paul Rozin (born 1936) is a professor of psychology at the University of Pennsylvania.  He teaches two Benjamin Franklin Scholars (BFS) honors courses and graduate level seminars. He is also a faculty member in the Master of Applied Positive Psychology program started by Martin Seligman. He is described as the world's leading expert on disgust. His work focuses on the psychological, cultural, and biological determinants of human food choice.

Rozin earned a bachelor's degree from the University of Chicago in 1956, and doctoral degrees in biology and psychology from Harvard University in 1961. In 1963, he joined the psychology department at the University of Pennsylvania, where in 1997 he was named the Edmund J. and Louise W. Kahn Professor. He also served as co-director of the school's Solomon Asch Center for the Study of Ethnopolitical Conflict (which has now moved to Bryn Mawr College).

His teaching and research interests include: acquisition of likes and dislikes for foods, nature and development of the magical belief in contagion, cultural evolution of disgust, ambivalence to animal foods, lay conception of risk of infection and toxic effects of foods, interaction of moral and health factors in concerns about risks, relation between people's desires to have desires and their actual desires (including the problem of internalization), acquisition of culture, nature of cuisine and cultural evolution, and psychological responses to recycled water.

Bibliography
Rozin, P., Haidt, J., & McCauley, C.R. (1993). Disgust. In M. Lewis and J. Haviland (Eds.), Handbook of Emotions, pp. 575–594. New York: Guilford.
Rozin, P., & Nemeroff, C.J. (1990). The laws of sympathetic magic: A psychological analysis of similarity and contagion. In J. Stigler, G. Herdt & R.A. Shweder (Eds.), Cultural Psychology: Essays on comparative human development (pp. 205–232). Cambridge, England: Cambridge.
Rozin, P., Fischler, C., Imada, S., Sarubin, A., & Wrzesniewski, A.  (1999).  Attitudes to food and the role of food in life: Comparisons of Flemish Belgium, France, Japan and the United States.  Appetite,  33, 163-180.
Rozin, P. (1999).   Food is fundamental, fun, frightening, and far-reaching.  Social Research, 66, 9-30.
Rozin, P., Lowery, L., Imada, S., & Haidt, J.  (1999).  The CAD triad hypothesis: A mapping between three moral emotions (contempt, anger, disgust) and three moral codes (community, autonomy, divinity).  Journal of Personality & Social Psychology, 76, 574-586.

References

External links
Paul Rozin's homepage at the University of Pennsylvania
Lecture on Food and Culture
Penn Arts and Science A biographical interview with Rozin.
Ad Research Copymetrics.com Cognitive Science research in Advertising with participation of Rozin

1936 births
Living people
University of Chicago alumni
Harvard University alumni
University of Pennsylvania faculty
American moral psychologists